Dehram District is a district (bakhsh) in Farashband County, Fars Province, Iran. At the 2006 census, its population was 7,862, in 1,735 families.  The District has one city: Dehram.  The District has two rural districts (dehestan): Dehram Rural District and Dezh Gah Rural District.

References 

Farashband County
Districts of Fars Province